Juan del Pozo Horta (13 December 1584 – 16 August 1660) was a Roman Catholic prelate who served as Bishop of Segovia (1656–1660), Bishop of León (1650–1656), and Bishop of Lugo (1646–1650).

Biography
Juan del Pozo Horta was born in Valladolid and ordained a priest in the Order of Preachers.
On 16 July 1646, he was appointed during the papacy of Pope Innocent X as Bishop of Lugo.
On 14 October 1646, he was consecrated bishop by Giulio Rospigliosi, Titular Archbishop of Tarsus, with Miguel Avellán, Titular Bishop of Siriensis, and Timoteo Pérez Vargas, Titular Bishop of Lystra, serving as co-consecrators.
On 10 January 1650, he was appointed during the papacy of Pope Innocent X as Bishop of León. 
On 1 April 1656, he was selected by the King of Spain and confirmed by Pope Alexander VII on 28 August 1656 as Bishop of Segovia.
He served as Bishop of Segovia until his death on 16 August 1660.

While bishop, he was the principal co-consecrator of Juan Pérez de Vega, Bishop of Tui (1649).

References

External links and additional sources
 (for Chronology of Bishops) 
 (for Chronology of Bishops) 
 (for Chronology of Bishops) 
 (for Chronology of Bishops) 
 (for Chronology of Bishops) 
 (for Chronology of Bishops) 

17th-century Roman Catholic bishops in Spain
Bishops appointed by Pope Gregory XIII
Bishops appointed by Pope Alexander VII
1584 births
1660 deaths